Irving Martin is an Executive Producer, Creative Director and Record Producer.

Background 
In the 1970s he worked as a record producer, writer and film music supervisor. He was awarded several Multi-Platinum and Gold record awards.

In the 1980s he headed Scores Ltd,. the #1 Company in Europe for trailers, promos, interstitial segment conceptualization/production and film music production. He launched Sky TV in Europe. He conceived and produced the A Year To Remember' series - selling over 3m copies. He won several awards for soundtracks and record production.

1990 - 1995 - Working Title Films, Head of Special Projects, a multi faceted role interfacing WT with all areas in the Polygram Group, promo production and directing related shoots.

1996 to 2005 - In partnership with The Sanctuary Group - CEO Key Film and Film and TV - the leading infomercial producer in Europe.

He earned top international awards in direct response TV as a Producer and Director. He was credited with creating over $3.25b in sales.

His work as a record producer won US triple platinum (RIAA Cert) on the re-issue of the Dove Awarded recording of The Messiah - John Alldis/LPO/LPO Choir (Sparrow)

Career

1960s
He produced the Cheryl St. Clair single, "My Heart's Not in It" bw "We Want Love", released on CBS 202041 in 1966.
In 1967, his productions included "Crystal Ball" bw "Didn't I" for Guy Darrell, "Come Back Baby Come Back" bw "Since My Baby Said Goodbye" for Romeo Z and "Leave It To Me" bw "Anyway That You Want Me" for Gary Bell.

1970s
In October, 1973, the record "I've Been Hurt" which he produced for Guy Darrell was in the British chart. He produced the four record set, The Messiah by The London Philharmonic Orchestra & Choir that was released on Birdwing BWR-2011 in late 1979. The album featured four soloists. The reviewer called the work awesome and made note of the Christian story being delivered in a new and vibrant way. The executive producer was Billy Ray Hearn.

Present 
Presently works as a consultant, mentor and as a freelance producer and director on various music, advertising and TV projects.

Compositions
 "Return of the Saint" (composer) - 1978
 "We Want Love" sung by Cheryl St. Clair - 1966
 "Death's Other Dominion" Space 1999  (co writer) - (1976)
 "Black Sun" Space 1999 (co writer) - (1976)
 "Dance The Night Away" by Sheer Elegance - 1977
 "Earthy" by Monaco - 1978

References

Links
 List of Irving Martin Productions

Living people
Year of birth missing (living people)